Stratford station in Stratford, Ontario, Canada is served by four Via Rail trains daily running between Sarnia, London and Toronto. The station, though outside the immediate downtown area, is relatively central. The station building is wheelchair accessible. Via accommodates wheelchair access into the trains provided 48 hours' notice.

On October 18, 2021, GO Transit started weekday service though Stratford, between Toronto and London. The pilot service does not offer Presto access and riders need to purchase e-tickets.

History

From the fall of 1863, a young Thomas Edison worked as a telegrapher at the Stratford, Ontario station of the Grand Trunk Railroad.[Conot, Robert: Thomas A Edison, A Streak Of Luck, Da Capo Press, p.16] Edison's father was from Canada and fled to US after the Rebellion of 1837.

Two structures remain that were built in 1913 by the Grand Trunk Railway (GTR): a two-storey, brick-clad, railway station building, and a one-storey express building linked by an overhead canopy. The GTR merged into the Canadian National Railway in 1920. In addition to serving regional trains, it served international trains to Michigan and Chicago, including the Grand Trunk's long-running Maple Leaf.

The station buildings were designated as a Heritage Railway Station in 1993. The station is also designated under Part IV of the Ontario Heritage Act since June 13, 1988.

The Ontario Heritage Act designation notes that the station is built in the Prairie Style of architecture, influenced by Frank Lloyd Wright. It was erected by the Grand Trunk in 1913 and opened in August 1914. The designation covers the exterior of the whole structure, roof, masonry, windows, original doors and brick platforms (these were covered at the time of the designation in 1988). The building included a tower, that has since been removed.

The International Limited was operated jointly by Via Rail and Amtrak between Chicago and Toronto. The service, which had started in 1982, was discontinued in 2004.

See also

 Quebec City–Windsor Corridor (Via Rail) – trans-provincial passenger rail corridor which includes Stratford
 Rail transport in Ontario
 List of designated heritage railway stations of Canada

References

External links

Via Rail stations in Ontario
Buildings and structures in Stratford, Ontario
Rail transport in Stratford, Ontario
Grand Trunk Railway stations in Ontario
Designated heritage railway stations in Ontario
Designated heritage properties in Ontario
Former Amtrak stations in Canada
Prairie School architecture
Railway stations in Perth County, Ontario
Canadian Register of Historic Places in Ontario